

The Wonderboom (Ficus salicifolia) is an evergreen fig species that ranges from the KwaZulu-Natal midlands northwards to tropical East Africa. It grows especially on outcrops, rocky hillsides and along cliffs fringing water courses and may rarely grow up to 10 m tall, and acquire a leafy spreading crown.

Description
The elliptic-oblong, leathery leaves of about 7 to 10 cm long, are carried on long petioles, and are often noticeably folded along the midrib. The leaf sides are almost parallel and clear net-veining is visible on the lamina. Leaves are brittle and have a characteristic smell when broken or bruised. The leaves are toxic and cause nervous disorders or even deaths in cattle.

The small, smooth figs are carried on short stalks and measure about 4–6 mm in diameter. They are massed along the branchlets in the leaf axils, and change from white to yellowish-red and spotted as they ripen. The figs are eaten by birds and mammals.

Similar species
It may be confused with the similar but deciduous Ficus ingens which grows in similar habitat. The latter has somewhat larger, white to purple figs, and deep red fresh foliage. The Wonderboom fig is sometimes deemed a race of Ficus cordata,  i.e. F. c. subsp. salicifolia (Vahl) C.C.Berg, though the latter species has yellowish sessile figs and a more westerly distribution.

Distribution and habitat

It occurs in the Saharo-montane woodlands of the Tassili n'Ajjer, the Hoggar, Aïr and Tibesti mountains, the Kerkour Nourene massif and at Elba mountain in the Red Sea Hills. It is widespread in the eastern Afrotropics, from southern Arabia and Socotra to the KwaZulu-Natal midlands of South Africa.

The Wonderboom grove
The species is named after the Wonderboom grove in Pretoria, that has spread from a central bole that was carbon dated to about 1,000 years old. The Wonderboom is an extraordinary specimen for its size and structure, and its drooping branches are continuing to root and form new trees. Their branches reach about 23 metres into the sky, and one of the boles has a girth of 5½ metres.

Ecology
The pollinator wasp is Platyscapa awekei Wiebes., while non-pollinating wasps include Otitesella serrata Mayr and O. pseudoserrata van Noort.

Gallery

References

Trees of Africa
Flora of Southern Africa
Taxa named by Martin Vahl
salicifolia